Morse is an unincorporated community and census-designated place (CDP) in Hansford County, Texas, United States. The population was 147 at the 2010 census, down from 172 at the 2000 census.

Geography
Morse is located in southwestern Hansford County at  (36.060645, -101.476470). Its southern border is the Hutchinson County line.

Demographics
As of the census of 2000, there were 125 people, 61 households, and 45 families residing in the CDP. The population density was 315.6 people per square mile (120.7/km2). There were 63 housing units at an average density of 115.6/sq mi (44.2/km2). The racial makeup of the CDP was 99.42% White, 0.58% from other races. Hispanic or Latino of any race were 22.09% of the population.

There were 61 households, out of which 45.9% had children under the age of 18 living with them, 67.2% were married couples living together, 3.3% had a female householder with no husband present, and 24.6% were non-families. 24.6% of all households were made up of individuals, and 11.5% had someone living alone who was 65 years of age or older. The average household size was 2.82 and the average family size was 3.37.

In the CDP, the population was spread out, with 32.6% under the age of 18, 9.3% from 18 to 24, 26.7% from 25 to 44, 20.9% from 45 to 64, and 10.5% who were 65 years of age or older. The median age was 36 years. For every 100 females, there were 107.2 males. For every 100 females age 18 and over, there were 107.1 males.

The median income for a household in the CDP was $37,143, and the median income for a family was $40,750. Males had a median income of $21,875 versus $22,000 for females. The per capita income for the CDP was $13,104. There were 8.7% of families and 9.9% of the population living below the poverty line, including 10.4% of under eighteens and 13.3% of those over 64.

Education
Morse is served by the Pringle-Morse Consolidated Independent School District.

Climate
According to the Köppen climate classification, Morse has a semiarid climate, BSk on climate maps.

References

Census-designated places in Hansford County, Texas
Census-designated places in Texas